Broadfoot is an English surname. Notable people with this surname include:

 Barry Broadfoot (1926-2003), Canadian journalist
 Chris Broadfoot (born 1981), Australian footballer
 Darryl Broadfoot, Scottish football writer
 Dave Broadfoot (1925-2016), Canadian comedian
 David Broadfoot (1899-1953), Scottish seaman
 George Broadfoot (1807–1845), English soldier
 Grover L. Broadfoot (1892-1962), American judge
 Joe Broadfoot (born 1940), English footballer
 Kirk Broadfoot (born 1984), Scottish football player
 Louise Broadfoot (born 1978), Australian cricket player
 Patricia Broadfoot (born 1949), English academic
 Ross Broadfoot (born 1985), English rugby player
 Walter Broadfoot (1881-1965), New Zealand politician

Surnames from nicknames